Elias IV may refer to:

Count Elias IV of Périgord (1083–1155)
Eliya IV, patriarch of the Church of the East (c. 1405–c. 1425)